Kleyr Vieira dos Santos (born 14 September 1980 in Rio Branco), simply Kleyr, is a Brazilian professional footballer who plays Eastern District as a striker.

External links
 
 
 Kleyr Vieira Dos Santos at HKFA

1980 births
Living people
Association football forwards
Brazilian footballers
Brazilian expatriate footballers
Sociedade Esportiva Matsubara players
Sport Club Corinthians Paulista players
Osasco Futebol Clube players
São José Esporte Clube players
Grêmio Barueri Futebol players
Roma Esporte Apucarana players
Goiás Esporte Clube players
Vila Nova Futebol Clube players
Varzim S.C. players
Avaí FC players
Associação Portuguesa de Desportos players
Associação Atlética Ponte Preta players
Botafogo Futebol Clube (SP) players
Rio Branco Football Club players
Clube Atlético Juventus players
Associação Atlética Anapolina players
FC Vilnius players
FC Gloria Buzău players
ŁKS Łódź players
Hapoel Kfar Saba F.C. players
Sociedade Esportiva do Gama players
Grêmio Esportivo Brasil players
Santa Cruz Futebol Clube players
Araguaína Futebol e Regatas players
União Recreativa dos Trabalhadores players
Uberaba Sport Club players
Sport Huancayo footballers
C.D. Olmedo footballers
Al-Faisaly SC players
Campeonato Brasileiro Série A players
Campeonato Brasileiro Série B players
Campeonato Brasileiro Série C players
Campeonato Brasileiro Série D players
Liga Portugal 2 players
A Lyga players
Liga I players
Ekstraklasa players
Liga Leumit players
Peruvian Primera División players
Expatriate footballers in Portugal
Expatriate footballers in Lithuania
Expatriate footballers in Romania
Expatriate footballers in Poland
Expatriate footballers in Israel
Expatriate footballers in Peru
Expatriate footballers in Ecuador
Expatriate footballers in Jordan
Expatriate footballers in Hong Kong
Brazilian expatriate sportspeople in Portugal
Brazilian expatriate sportspeople in Lithuania
Brazilian expatriate sportspeople in Romania
Brazilian expatriate sportspeople in Poland
Brazilian expatriate sportspeople in Israel
Brazilian expatriate sportspeople in Peru
Brazilian expatriate sportspeople in Ecuador
Brazilian expatriate sportspeople in Hong Kong
People from Rio Branco, Acre
Sportspeople from Acre (state)